Religious banking may refer to:

 Christian finance
 Islamic banking and finance

See also 
 Buddhist economics
 Economics of religion